The Third Intermediate Period of ancient Egypt began with the death of Pharaoh Ramesses XI in 1077 BC, which ended the New Kingdom, and was eventually followed by the Late Period. Various points are offered as the beginning for the latter era, though it is most often regarded as dating from the foundation of the Twenty-Sixth Dynasty by Psamtik I in 664 BC, following the departure of the Nubian Kushite rulers of the Twenty-fifth Dynasty after they were driven out by the Assyrians under King Ashurbanipal. The concept of a "Third Intermediate Period" was coined in 1978 by British Egyptologist Kenneth Kitchen.

The period was one of decline and political instability, coinciding with the Late Bronze Age collapse of civilizations in the ancient Near East and Eastern Mediterranean (including the Greek Dark Ages). It was marked by division of the state for much of the period and conquest and rule by non-native Egyptians.

History

Twenty-first Dynasty 

The period of the Twenty-first Dynasty is characterized by the country's fracturing kingship. Already during Ramesses XI's reign, the Twentieth Dynasty of Egypt was losing its grip on the city of Thebes, whose priests were becoming increasingly powerful. After his death, his successor, Smendes I, ruled from the city of Tanis, but was mostly active only in Lower Egypt, which he controlled. Meanwhile, the High Priests of Amun at Thebes ruled Middle and Upper Egypt in all but name. However, this division was less significant than it seems, since both the priests and pharaohs came from the same family.

Twenty-second and Twenty-third Dynasty 

The country was firmly reunited by the Twenty-second Dynasty founded by Shoshenq I in 945 BC (or 943 BC), who descended from Meshwesh immigrants, originally from ancient Libya. This brought stability to the country for well over a century, but after the reign of Osorkon II, particularly, the country had effectively split into two states, with Shoshenq III of the Twenty-second Dynasty controlling Lower Egypt by 818 BC while Takelot II and his son Osorkon (the future Osorkon III) ruled Middle and Upper Egypt. In Thebes, a civil war engulfed the city, pitting the forces of Pedubast I, who had proclaimed himself pharaoh, against the existing line of Takelot II/Osorkon B. The two factions squabbled continuously and the conflict was only resolved in Year 39 of Shoshenq III when Osorkon B comprehensively defeated his enemies. He proceeded to found the Upper Egyptian Libyan Twenty-third Dynasty of Osorkon III – Takelot III – Rudamun, but this kingdom quickly fragmented after Rudamun's death, with the rise of local city states under kings such as Peftjaubast of Herakleopolis, Nimlot of Hermopolis, and Ini at Thebes.

Twenty-fourth Dynasty 

The Nubian kingdom to the south took full advantage of this division and the ensuing political instability. Prior to Piye's Year 20 campaign into Egypt, the previous Nubian ruler – Kashta – had already extended his kingdom's influence into Thebes when he compelled Shepenupet, the serving Divine Adoratice of Amun and Takelot III's sister, to adopt his own daughter Amenirdis, to be her successor. Then, 20 years later, around 732 BC his successor, Piye, marched north and defeated the combined might of several native Egyptian rulers: Peftjaubast, Osorkon IV of Tanis, Iuput II of Leontopolis and Tefnakht of Sais.

Twenty-fifth Dynasty 

Piye established the Twenty-fifth Dynasty and appointed the defeated rulers as his provincial governors. He was succeeded first by his brother, Shabaka, and then by his two sons Shebitku and Taharqa. The reunited Nile valley empire of the 25th Dynasty was as large as it had been since the New Kingdom. Pharaohs of the dynasty, among them Taharqa, built or restored temples and monuments throughout the Nile valley, including at Memphis, Karnak, Kawa, and Jebel Barkal. The 25th Dynasty ended with its rulers retreating to their spiritual homeland at Napata.  It was there (at El-Kurru and Nuri) that all 25th Dynasty pharaohs were buried under the first pyramids to be constructed in the Nile valley in hundreds of years.  The Napatan dynasty led to the Kingdom of Kush, which flourished in Napata and Meroe until at least the 2nd century AD.

The international prestige of Egypt had declined considerably by this time. The country's international allies had fallen firmly into the sphere of influence of Assyria and from about 700 BC the question became when, not if, there would be war between the two states as Esarhaddon had realised that a conquest of Lower Egypt was necessary to protect Assyrian interests in the Levant.

Despite Egypt's size and wealth, Assyria had a greater supply of timber, while Egypt had a chronic shortage, allowing Assyria to produce more charcoal needed for iron-smelting and thus giving Assyria a greater supply of iron weaponry. This disparity became critical during the Assyrian invasions of Egypt over the period 670–663 BC.  Consequently, pharaoh Taharqa's reign, and that of his successor Tantamani, were filled with constant conflict with the Assyrians. In 664 BC the Assyrians delivered a mortal blow, sacking Thebes and Memphis. Following these events, and starting with Atlanersa, no Kushite ruler would ever rule over Egypt again.

End of the Third Intermediate Period 

Upper Egypt remained for a time under the rule of Taharqa and Tantamani, whilst Lower Egypt was ruled from 664 BC by the nascent 26th Dynasty, client kings established by the Assyrians. In 663 BC, Tantamani launched a full-scale invasion of Lower Egypt, taking Memphis in April of this year, killing Necho I of Sais in the process as Necho had remained loyal to Ashurbanipal. Tantamani barely had the time to receive the submission of some Delta kinglets and expel the remaining Assyrians that a large army led by Ashurbanipal and Necho's son Psamtik I came back. Tantamani was defeated north of Memphis and Thebes was thoroughly sacked shortly after. The Kushite king withdrew to Nubia while the Assyrian influence in Upper Egypt quickly waned. Permanently weakened by the sack, Thebes peacefully submitted itself to Psamtik's fleet in 656 BC. To affirm his authority, Psamtik  placed his daughter in position to be the future Divine Adoratrice of Amun, thereby also submitting the priesthood of Amun and effectively uniting Egypt. Tantamani's successor Atlanersa was in no position to attempt a reconquest of Egypt as Psamtik also secured the southern border at Elephantine and may even have sent a military campaign to Napata. Concurrently, Psamtik managed to free himself from the Assyrian vassalage while remaining on good terms with Ashurbanipal, possibly owing to an ongoing rebellion in Babylon. By doing so, he brought  increased stability to the country during his 54-year reign from the city of Sais.

Four successive Saite kings continued guiding Egypt into another period of peace and prosperity from 610 to 525 BC. Unfortunately for this dynasty, a new power was growing in the Near East – the Achaemenid Empire of Persia. Pharaoh Psamtik III had succeeded his father Ahmose II for only 6 months before he had to face the Persian Empire at Pelusium. The Persians had already taken Babylon and Egypt was no match for them. Psamtik III was defeated and briefly escaped to Memphis, before he was ultimately imprisoned and, later, executed at Susa, the capital of the Persian king Cambyses, who now assumed the formal title of Pharaoh.

Historiography 
The historiography of this period is disputed for a variety of reasons. Firstly, there is a dispute about the utility of a very artificial term that covers an extremely long and complicated period of Egyptian history. The Third Intermediate Period includes long periods of stability as well as chronic instability and civil conflict: its very name rather clouds this fact. Secondly, there are significant problems of chronology stemming from several areas, there are the difficulties in dating that are common to all of Egyptian chronology and are compounded by synchronisms with Biblical archaeology that also contain heavily disputed dates.

Fringe theories
Peter James, along with several other academics, argued contra Kitchen that the period lasted less than 200 years, starting later than 850 BC but ending at the conventional date, as the five dynasties had many years of overlap.  Some theorists such as David Rohl have controversial theories about the family relationships of the dynasties comprising the period.

See also
 Late Bronze Age collapse

References

Bibliography 
 Dodson, Aidan Mark. 2001. "Third Intermediate Period." In The Oxford Encyclopedia of Ancient Egypt, edited by Donald Bruce Redford. Vol. 3 of 3 vols. Oxford, New York, and Cairo: Oxford University Press and The American University in Cairo Press. 388–394.
 Kitchen, Kenneth Anderson. [1996]. The Third Intermediate Period in Egypt (1100–650 BC). 3rd ed. Warminster: Aris & Phillips Limited.
 Myśliwiec, Karol. 2000. The Twilight of Ancient Egypt: First Millennium B.C.E. Translated by David Lorton. Ithaca and London: Cornell University Press.
 Porter, Robert M. 2008. A Network of 22nd–26th Dynasty Genealogies, JARCE 44, 153–157.
 Taylor, John H. 2000. “The Third Intermediate Period (1069–664 BC).” In The Oxford History of Ancient Egypt, edited by Ian Shaw. Oxford and New York: Oxford University Press. 330–368.

External links
 Allen, James, and Marsha Hill. "Egypt in the Third Intermediate Period (1070–712 B.C.)", In Heilbrunn Timeline of Art History. New York: The Metropolitan Museum of Art, 2000–. (October 2004)
Images

Artabase.net: Face from a Coffin
Artabase.net: Right Hand from an Anthropoid Coffin

 
States and territories established in the 11th century BC
States and territories disestablished in the 7th century BC
Dynasties of ancient Egypt
Egypt 1070BCE
11th century BC in Egypt
10th century BC in Egypt
9th century BC in Egypt
8th century BC in Egypt
7th century BC in Egypt

.
.
Late Bronze Age collapse